Kimrie Denise Lewis is an American actress. She is best known for playing Poppy Banks on the ABC comedy Single Parents. She had a recurring role as reporter Ashley Davidson on Scandal.

Early life and education 
Kimrie Lewis graduated from New York University Tisch School of the Arts, with a B.A. in Theatre.

Career
Lewis recurred as reporter Ashley on the ABC television series Scandal. She appeared as Meg in Peeples with Kerry Washington, Craig Robinson and David Alan Grier. She recurred in the ABC Family drama series Chasing Life as Madeline. She has appeared in several commercials including for McDonald's, Sherwin-Williams, and Country Music Television.

In August 2016, TV Line reported that Lewis would guest star in season 5 of the Hulu comedy The Mindy Project. Lewis began starring as a series regular on the ABC comedy Single Parents in 2018. Lewis began starring as a main character on the NBC comedy Kenan in 2021.

Filmography

Film

Television

References

External links
 

Living people
American film actresses
American television actresses
Actresses from Los Angeles
Tisch School of the Arts alumni
Writers from Los Angeles
American women comedians
Year of birth missing (living people)